Mathieu R. Roy (born November 14, 1986) is a Canadian professional ice hockey wing. He is currently signed to ECHL side Norfolk Admirals. He was most recently under contract with the Glasgow Clan of the Elite Ice Hockey League (EIHL).

Playing career
As a youth, Roy played in the 1997 Quebec International Pee-Wee Hockey Tournament with a minor ice hockey team from Beauce, Quebec.

Roy played junior hockey in the QMJHL for the Acadie–Bathurst Titan and the Val-d'Or Foreurs, before starting his professional career with the Pensacola Ice Pilots. He was moved to the Everblades for the 2008–09 season, and he has primarily remained with the team since, aside from two one-game call-ups to the AHL, where he played for the Albany River Rats and the Rochester Americans.

In his first season as captain of the Florida Everblades in 2011–12, Roy scored 46 points in 65 games and 10 points in the playoffs to help guide Florida to its first Kelly Cup championship. In re-signing to a one-year contract with the Everblades on July 24, 2012, it marked his fifth professional season with the club.

In the opening game of the 2012–13 season, Roy helped raised a special championship banner in a pre-game ceremony, before scoring the first goal of the season in a 5–4 overtime victory against the Orlando Solar Bears on October 13, 2012. Roy returned to the AHL for the first time since 2009, after he was loaned to the Lake Erie Monsters, and registered an assist, in a 7–6 overtime defeat to the Rochester Americans on December 26, 2012. Roy appeared in 3 games before he was returned to the ECHL for the remainder of the season. Roy recorded career highs with 89 points in 69 games with the Everblades, finishing as the league's top goal and points scorer, the first to do so since 2009, and earning two consecutive player of the month awards (February, March), a first since 2008.

After six seasons in the ECHL with the Everblades, Roy opted to pursue a European career, signing a one-year deal with Norwegian club, Tønsberg Vikings who were then with GET-ligaen on May 21, 2014. After Tønsberg suffered some internal problems, the team stepped down to a lower league and Roy decided to end his contract and then agreed to a contract with English club, the Sheffield Steelers of the Elite Ice Hockey League on July 24, 2014.

In July 2019, Roy returned to hockey and the UK by signing with Glasgow Clan of the EIHL, a team coached by his former Sheffield teammate Zack Fitzgerald.

On August 27, 2020, Roy returned to North America to continue his career in the ECHL, agreeing to a contract with the Kalamazoo Wings.

With Kalamazoo not taking part in the 2020-21 ECHL season, Roy signed for SPHL side Knoxville Ice Bears in February 2021.

In July 2021, Roy returned to Glasgow Clan ahead of the 2021-22 Elite League season. He was then named captain for the 2022-23 season, but left Glasgow in December 2022 to pursue a 'long-term opportunity' back in North America.

Roy then signed a deal to return to the ECHL with Norfolk Admirals.

Career statistics

Awards and honours

References

External links

1986 births
Acadie–Bathurst Titan players
Canadian ice hockey left wingers
Florida Everblades players
Ice hockey people from Quebec
Lake Erie Monsters players
Living people
Norfolk Admirals (ECHL) players
Pensacola Ice Pilots players
People from Amos, Quebec
Rochester Americans players
Sheffield Steelers players
Val-d'Or Foreurs players
Glasgow Clan players
Canadian expatriate ice hockey players in England
Knoxville Ice Bears (SPHL) players
Canadian expatriate ice hockey players in Scotland
Canadian expatriate ice hockey players in the United States